Jiaozhou, formerly Jiaoxian or Jiao County, is a county-level city of Qingdao sub-provincial city, Shandong Province, China. It gained its current county-level city designation in 1987.

History
Jiaozhou, which belongs to Qingdao, Shandong, is located in the southwest of Shandong Peninsula and the northwest coast of Jiaozhou Bay. Chengyang District in the east, Jimo District in the west, Gaomi in the west, Huangdao District in the South and Pingdu in the north. The city is situated between 36 00 - 36 30 N, 119 37 - 120E, 51 kilometers across the East and west, 54.3 kilometers in the north and south, with a total area of 1324 square kilometers. As of 2016, there were six streets and six towns in Jiaozhou, with a total resident population of 89,3000. Local GDP reached 103.59 billion yuan, of which the added value of the primary industry was 4.944 billion yuan, the added value of the secondary industry was 53.815 billion yuan and the added value of the tertiary industry was 44.781 billion yuan. The proportion of three industries is 4.8:52:43.2. Per capita GDP reached 117.63 million yuan. Jiaozhou has a history of more than 5000 years, and still retains the Sanlihe cultural site in the Neolithic Age, which integrates Dawenkou culture and Longshan culture. Banqiao Town was established in the Tang Dynasty, Shengzhou was prosperous in the Northern Song Dynasty, and maritime trade continued to flourish. Special Shipping Department and Jiaoxi Chaoshang were the only foreign trade ports north of the Yangtze River and one of the five major commercial ports in the country. They were the important nodes of the "Maritime Silk Road". In 2017, Jiaozhou was selected as the fifth national civilized city. In December 2017, it was selected into the list of the top 100 industrial counties (cities) in 2017 (ranked 18). In November 2018, it was named "China's Happy Hundred Counties List 2018". In October 2018, it was selected to establish the list of the pilot areas of rural primary, secondary and tertiary industry integration and development in 2018. In November 2018, he was selected as one of the top 100 industrial counties (cities) in China and the top 100 of the comprehensive well-off index of county-level cities in China. In December 2018, it was selected as the top 100 of the comprehensive competitiveness of county economy, the top 100 of the investment potential, the top 100 of the best commercial cities in mainland China in 2018 and the top 30 of the best county-level cities in China.

Sports

The 12,000-capacity Jiaozhou Sports Centre Stadium is located in Jiaozhou. It is mainly used for association football and also sometimes for athletics and other events.

Administrative divisions
As 2012, this city is divided to 7 subdistricts and 10 towns.
Subdistricts

Towns

Climate

See also 

 Jiaozhou Bay

References

External links 
 Official site

Cities in Shandong
County-level divisions of Shandong
Geography of Qingdao